Room Service is a 1938 RKO film comedy directed by William A. Seiter, based on the 1937 play of the same name by Allen Boretz and John Murray. The film stars the Marx Brothers (Groucho Marx, Harpo Marx and Chico Marx) and also features Lucille Ball, Ann Miller and Frank Albertson.

This is the only film starring the Marx Brothers with a screenplay based on material that was not written especially for the team. Less frenetic and more physically contained than their other films, the plot revolves around the shenanigans of getting a stage play produced and funded by mysterious backer Zachary Fisk, while evading paying a large hotel bill.

RKO remade the movie in 1944 as Step Lively, starring George Murphy and Frank Sinatra using ample recycled footage from the original film.

Plot
Gordon Miller, a flat-broke theatrical producer, whose staff includes Harry Binelli and Faker Englund, is told by his brother-in-law Joseph Gribble, manager of the White Way Hotel, that he and his cast of twenty-two actors, who have run up a bill of $1,200, must leave the hotel immediately or face the wrath of supervising director Gregory Wagner. Miller has hidden the cast and crew of his play, Hail and Farewell, in the empty hotel ballroom. Miller is planning on skipping out on the hotel without paying the bill when he receives word that one of his actresses, Christine Marlowe, has arranged for a backer. Miller must keep his room and the cast and crew hidden until he can meet with the backer and receive a check.

At the same time, Wagner discovers Miller's debt. Assured by Gribble that Miller had skipped without paying his bill, Wagner is surprised to find Miller still in his room, now joined by the play's author, Leo Davis, who has arrived in town and checked into Miller's room.

When Wagner threatens to evict Miller before the backer can arrive, Miller and Binelli convince Davis to pretend to be sick. To obtain food, Miller promises waiter Sasha Smirnoff a part in the play. When Davis leaves to meet with girlfriend Hilda Manney, Englund takes over as the sick patient examined by a doctor brought in by Mr. Wagner. Wagner leaves to confront the crowd in the ballroom, while the doctor examines the patient. To delay the doctor giving his report to Wagner, Binelli and Miller tie him up, gag him, and lock him in the bathroom. The agent for Zachary Fisk, the wealthy backer, arrives to sign over the check, the doctor breaks free in the bathroom, and the agent is hit on the head accidentally as Englund chases a flying turkey around with a baseball bat. The agent just wants to escape the madness, but reluctantly signs over the check, and leaves.

Davis returns and says he heard the agent say he will stop payment on the check, and just signed it to get out of the room. Wagner is fooled into believing all is well, and upgrades the boys to a fancier room and extends them more credit. Later, as the play is about to open, the check from Fisk bounces, Miller, Binelli, and Englund manipulate Wagner into believing he's driven the play's author to take poison. They pretend to give Davis large quantities of Ipecac (which is actually drunk by Englund), and he eventually pretends to die. Then Englund disappears and reappears pretending to have committed suicide. Wagner is bluffed into believing it's all his fault and helps take the "body" down to the alley. As Miller and Wagner prop Englund on a crate, a passing policeman asks what's going on. Miller bluffs their way out of the situation, so he and Wagner make an escape, leaving Englund "asleep". They go to watch the end of the play, which is a scene where the miners are bringing a body from out of the mine. The body on the stretcher is Englund's. Wagner realizes he's been duped as the play is greeted with thunderous applause and a revived Davis appears next to Wagner, causing him to faint.

Main cast

*Indicates the actor created the role on Broadway.

Production
Zeppo Marx, who had retired from the screen after Duck Soup and was now representing his brothers, brokered a deal with RKO to produce the version of the Broadway play Room Service by John Murray and Allan Boretz. The play was adapted for the Marxes by Morrie Ryskind. Room Service was the only film in which neither the story nor the characters were created especially for the Marx Brothers.

This was only the second Marx Brothers film (the other being Duck Soup) in which Chico does not play the piano and Harpo does not play the harp.

Ann Miller was only 15 years old when she made this film. She had lied about her age and obtained a fake birth certificate when she was about 14 years old, which stated that she was 18, just prior to signing with RKO Pictures. In a Private Screenings interview with Robert Osborne on Turner Classic Movies, Miller described her experience with the Marx brothers. Miller described a situation in which Harpo Marx dropped his pants in front of her, beeped his horn and chased her across the set. Miller described her being so "scared to death of the man" and thought he was "crazy", but she loved Groucho Marx.

Reception
Frank S. Nugent of The New York Times noted that the film had not changed much from the play and "the Marxes haven't made it any funnier; but neither has their presence interfered to any large extent with the disorderly progress of an antic piece. While there may be some question about the play's being a perfect Marx vehicle, there can be none about its being a thoroughly daffy show." Variety wrote that it would "do plenty of business and satisfy on the laugh score." "Sure-fire comedy smash ... the hilarious proceedings find the Marx Brothers right in their element," Film Daily wrote. Harrison's Reports called it "A good comedy" with a "pleasant" romance. John Mosher of The New Yorker wrote, "As comic pictures go, this ranks certainly above average; it has enough of the Marxian note for that. As Marx Brothers movies go, however, it is a minor effort."

The film recorded a loss of $330,000.

In popular culture
The basic plot of Room Service was used for the "Monkees, Manhattan Style" episode of The Monkees (season 1, episode 30, first broadcast April 10, 1967, also known as "Monkees in Manhattan").

References

External links

 
 
 
 The Marx Brothers Council Podcast "Room Service" episode

1938 films
1938 comedy films
American black-and-white films
1930s English-language films
Films directed by William A. Seiter
Films set in hotels
Films set in New York City
Marx Brothers (film series)
RKO Pictures films
1930s American films